The Best Pal Stakes is a Grade III American Thoroughbred horse race for two-year-olds over a distance of six furlongs on the dirt track scheduled annually in August at Del Mar Racetrack in Del Mar, California. The event currently carries a purse of $150,000.

History

The event was inaugurated on 30 October 1967 as the Balboa Stakes with split divisions on the final day of the Del Mar 62 day racing season which went into the deep autumn. The event was for three-year-olds and older, and held on the turf over a distance of nine furlongs. The name reflected several area locations — Balboa Park near San Diego, Balboa Peninsula up the coast in Newport Beach, and Balboa Avenue in Del Mar which is located adjacent to the Del Mar Fairgrounds — all named in honor of the Spanish explorer Vasco Núñez de Balboa.

The event was not run again until 1972 when conditions changed so that two-year-olds would run over a distance of  furlongs. In 1974, the event was moved to the dirt track and run over a one-mile distance.

In 1983 the event was classified as Grade III and was upgraded to Grade II in 2003.

In 1995 the event was renamed to honor Best Pal, a three time California Horse of the Year who won the Balboa Stakes in 1990 and whose career earnings totaled more than $5.6 million for his owner-breeder, Golden Eagle Farm.

The event has had several distance changes with last being in 2018 when the journey was set at six furlongs.

The event's position in the racing calendar at Del Mar has led to the race being a preparatory race for the Del Mar Futurity, which is scheduled usually several weeks later.

Other notable winners of this event include the 1994 winner Timber Country who went on that year to win the Breeders' Cup Juvenile and was crowned US Champion Two-Year-Old Horse who the following year became the first horse to ever win the Breeders' Cup Juvenile and American Triple Crown Classic Race when he won the 1995 Preakness Stakes. The 2009 winner, Lookin at Lucky, was crowned US Champion Two-Year-Old Horse and the following year also won the 2010 Preakness Stakes. The 2015 winner Nyquist followed up by winning the Del Mar Futurity and the Breeders' Cup Juvenile, along with being crowned the US Champion Two-Year-Old Horse and the following year winning the 2016 Kentucky Derby.

In 2022 the event's classification was downgraded from Grade II to Grade III.

Records
Speed record: 
6 furlongs: 1:10.22  – Havnameltdown (2012)
 furlongs: 1:15.08  – Officer (2001)
7 furlongs: 1:22.20  – Best Pal (1990)
1 mile: 1:35.40  – Doonesbury (1979) and Roving Boy (1982)

Margins:
 lengths – Instagrand (2018)

Most wins by a jockey:
 5 - Alex Solis (1994, 1996, 1997, 1999, 2006)

Most wins by a trainer:
 9 - Bob Baffert (1998, 2000, 2001, 2002, 2004, 2005, 2009, 2016, 2022)

Most wins by an owner:
 3 - Golden Eagle Farm (1990, 1992, 1998)

Best Pal Stakes – Del Mar Futurity double:
 Diabolo (1974), Visible (1976), Flying Paster (1978), Bold and Gold (1980), Saratoga Six (1984), Best Pal (1990), Worldly Manner (1998), Flame Thrower (2000), Officer (2001), Lookin At Lucky (2009),  (2010), Nyquist (2015), Klimt (2016)

Winners

Legend:

 
 
 

Notes:

‡ The inaugural running of the event in 1967 was for three year olds and older and was split into two divisions. The First Division winner Acknowledge was a six year old. The Second Division winner Het's Cadet was a four year old.

† In the 2008 Kelly Leak was first past the post but caused interference in the straight by drifting in and was disqualified and placed fourth. Azul Leon was declared the winner.

§ Ran as part of an entry

See also
List of American and Canadian Graded races

External links
 2020 Del Mar Media Guide

References

Del Mar Racetrack
Horse races in California
Flat horse races for two-year-olds
Graded stakes races in the United States
Recurring sporting events established in 1967
1967 establishments in California
Grade 2 stakes races in the United States